All the Kind Strangers, also known as Evil in the Swamp, is a 1974 American television film directed by Burt Kennedy. It originally aired as an ABC Movie of the Week on November 12, 1974.

Plot summary 

Children of a bootlegger in an extremely remote area of the U.S. have been orphaned when their mother died giving birth to the seventh of them at home and the distraught father fell off the roof of the house in a drunken stupor (information disseminated in the body of the film).  The oldest child, desperate to keep the remainder of his family together, has managed to keep the fate of his parents secret from the surrounding community due to the nearly inaccessible locale, resources available to keep the farm running smoothly and well trained, vicious watchdogs.  However, the minors feel need for guidance and are looking for replacement guardians going about it by sending the smaller, irresistibly cute moppets on errands requiring them to travel along local roads.  The youngsters cajole people considerate enough to pick them up into taking them home.  Guests are then maneuvered into staying so they can be put through an evaluation process at the end of which the children decide whether or not the candidates fit their idea of good parents.  Those who do not cut muster are free to go, so says the oldest sibling and his word has never been doubted amongst the rest of the family.  The new candidates for parenthood put up determined resistance and begin to exasperate the quietly tyrannical older child; but affection for the new couple and maturation are making the other children wonder about their method of choosing parental guidance and just where "all the kind strangers" are going when they leave.

Cast 
Stacy Keach as Jimmy Wheeler
Samantha Eggar as Carol Ann
John Savage as Peter
Robby Benson as John
Arlene Farber as Martha
Tim Parkison as Gilbert
Patti Parkison as Rita
Brent Campbell as James
John Connell as Baby

Soundtrack 
 Robby Benson - "All The Kind Strangers" (Music and lyrics by Regis Mull)
 Regis Mull - "What Are You Living For" (Music and lyrics by Regis Mull)

See also
 List of American films of 1974

References

External links 

1974 television films
1974 films
1970s thriller films
ABC Movie of the Week
Films about orphans
Films directed by Burt Kennedy
Films shot in Tennessee
American thriller television films
1970s English-language films
1970s American films